The  is a magnetic floppy disk drive peripheral for the Nintendo 64 game console developed by Nintendo. It was announced in 1995, prior to the Nintendo 64's 1996 launch, and after numerous delays was released in Japan on December 13, 1999. The "64" references both the Nintendo 64 console and the 64MB storage capacity of the disks, and "DD" is short for "disk drive" or "dynamic drive".

Plugging into the extension port on the underside of the console, the 64DD allows the Nintendo 64 to use proprietary 64MB magnetic disks for expanded and rewritable data storage, a real-time clock for persistent game world design, and a standard font and audio library for further storage efficiency. Its games and hardware accessories let the user create movies, characters, and animations to use within various other games and shared online. The system could connect to the Internet through a dedicated online service, Randnet, for e-commerce, online gaming, and media sharing. Describing it as "the first writable bulk data storage device for a modern video game console", Nintendo designed the 64DD as an enabling technology platform for the development of new genres of games and applications, several of which were in development for several years.

Only ten pieces of software were released until the unit was discontinued in February 2001, with 15,000 Randnet subscribers at the time. It was a commercial failure, with at least 15,000 total units being sold, and was never released outside Japan. Most games once planned for 64DD were released as standard Nintendo 64 games, ported to other consoles such as the GameCube, or canceled.

IGN lamented the "broken promises" and "vaporware", summarizing the 64DD as "an appealing creativity package" for "a certain type of user" that "delivered a well-designed user-driven experience"and as a "limited online experiment at the same time", which partially fulfilled Nintendo president Hiroshi Yamauchi's "longtime dream of a network that connects Nintendo consoles all across the nation".

History

Development 
With the 1993 announcement of its new Project Reality console, Nintendo explored options for data storage. A Nintendo spokesperson said in 1993 that "it could be a cartridge system, a CD system, or both, or something not ever used before." In 1994, Howard Lincoln, chairman of Nintendo of America said, "Right now, cartridges offer faster access time and more speed of movement and characters than CDs. So, we'll introduce our new hardware with cartridges. But eventually, these problems with CDs will be overcome. When that happens, you'll see Nintendo using CD as the software storage medium for our 64-bit system."

We could get an eight-speed CD-ROM mechanism in the unit, but in the under-$200 console market, it would be hard to pull that off." Describing the final choice of proprietary floppy disks instead of CD-ROM, Nintendo game designer Shigesato Itoi explained, "CD holds a lot of data, DD holds a moderate amount of data and backs the data up, and [cartridge] ROMs hold the least data and process the fastest. By attaching a DD to the game console, we can drastically increase the number of possible genres."

The company also explored the forging of an early online strategy with Netscape, whose founding management had recently come directly from SGI, the company which had designed the core Nintendo 64 hardware. Within its budding online strategy, Nintendo reportedly considered multiplayer online gaming to be of the highest priority, even above that of web browsing. Several third party game developers were developing prominent online gaming features based on 64DD, including Ocean's Mission: Impossible deathmatches and Seta's competitive four-player Ultimate War and online racing game. Nintendo would ultimately retain the core impetus of these ideas, but would drastically alter both plans over the following years, in favor of a floppy-based storage technology and the Randnet online software and service partner—although with no online multiplayer gaming support whatsoever.

Announcement 

Nintendo President Hiroshi Yamauchi announced the dual-storage strategy of the "bulky drive" at Nintendo's Shoshinkai 1995 trade show. He intended the product to be revealed at Shoshinkai 1996 and launched sometime in 1997, although giving virtually no technical specifications.

The 64DD was fully revealed at Nintendo's Shoshinkai 1996 show of November 22—24, 1996, where IGN reported that it was one of the biggest items of the show. There, Nintendo of America Chairman Howard Lincoln stated that the hardware specifications had been finalized and had its own show booth. Nintendo's Director of Corporate Communications, Perrin Kaplan, made the company's first official launch window announcement for the peripheral, scheduled for late 1997 in Japan. Core Magazine said, "Nintendo representatives insisted the system would be aggressively supported by third parties and Nintendo's internal development teams" with sequels for Super Mario 64 and Zelda 64, and 64DD originals Cabbage and Emperor of the Jungle. Nintendo's list of 64DD developers included Konami, Capcom, Enix, and Rare. Rare officially discounted any rumors of the peripheral's impending pre-release cancellation.

Reportedly, several developers attended the show to learn 64DD development, some having traveled from the US for the 64DD presentation and some having received 64DD development kits. A 64DD prototype was in a glass case, not visibly operational, but with a makeshift demonstration of Zelda 64 which was said to be running from disk. An improvised disk conversion of the familiar Super Mario 64 game demonstrated the drive's operation and performance, and a graphics application mapping the audience's photographical portraits onto live 3D animated avatars—a feature which was ultimately incorporated and released in 2000 as Mario Artist: Talent Studio and the Capture Cassette.

The event featured Creator, a music and animation game by Software Creations, the same UK company that had made Sound Tool for the Nintendo Ultra 64 development kit. They touted the game's ability to be integrated into other games, allowing a player to replace any such game's textures and possibly create new levels and characters. There was no playable version of Creator available there, but the project was later absorbed into Mario Artist: Paint Studio. Nintendo announced 64DD would be bundled with a RAM expansion cartridge.

Much of the gaming press said the 64DD reveal at Shoshinkai 1996 was not as significant as Nintendo had promised, leaving the public still unaware of the system's software lineup, practical capabilities, and release date. Zelda 64 (eventually released as the cartridge game The Legend of Zelda: Ocarina of Time) was seen as the 64DD's potential killer app in the months following the system's unveiling.

On April 3–4, 1997, Nintendo of America hosted a Developer's Conference in Seattle, Washington, where a surprise overview was delivered by Nintendo Developer Support staff Mark DeLoura about the 64DD.

Delays 
The 64DD is notable in part for two years of many launch delays, which created an interdependent cascade of delays and complications of many other business processes and product launches for Nintendo and its partners, and the cancellation of Space World 1998 due to lack of completed 64DD software. IGN reported in June 1999 that many called it "the most elusive piece of vaporware to date".

On May 30, 1997, Nintendo issued a press conference announcing the first 64DD launch delay, rescheduled to March 1998 with no comment on an American release schedule. This was reportedly attributed to the protracted development of both the disks and the drive technologies. On June 9, 1997, Nintendo and Alps Electric announced their manufacturing partnership for the still tentatively titled 64DD.

On June 18, 1997, at the E3 pre-show press conference, the company lacked even a prototype unit to display, while Howard Lincoln stated that the company wouldn't release the device until sufficient numbers of software releases support it. Reportedly featuring at least twenty games in development including Donkey Kong 64 and the sequel to Super Mario 64, the device retained its projected Japanese launch window of "at least" March 1998, and received its first American launch window of early 1998.  Also at the show, Nintendo confirmed that the 64DD would have Internet capability, and Nintendo's main game designer, Shigeru Miyamoto, speculated that its launch games could be SimCity 64, Mario Artist, Pocket Monsters, and Mother 3.

At Space World from November 21–24, 1997, the 64DD was shown prominently but its delay was extended from March 1998 to June 1998, with no mention of an international launch. Next Generation magazine observed the attendees and the demonstrations, finding no appeal to the US market from any current 64DD software, which was mainly Mario Artist and Pocket Monsters. The magazine said "64DD's future does not look good. And whether or not it was ever a serious mainstream contender is now open for debate", and wondered if 64DD would become "just an interesting footnote to the Nintendo 64 story". The magazine, and Argonaut Software founder Jez San, found Nintendo's third-party relations, and the third-parties' products, to be poor with no sign of improving; San said "Rumors have been circulating for a while that recently within Nintendo the main priority has been [...] taking development staff off other games and projects [at the expense of Nintendo 64 and 64DD] to make sure that Pocket Monsters was done on time." Nintendo's presentation focused mainly on first party Nintendo 64 cartridges and the top selling game of 1997, Pocket Monsters for Game Boy.

George Harrison, vice president of Nintendo of America, described the logistics of the 64DD launch delays:

In a December 1997 interview with Shigeru Miyamoto and Shigesato Itoi, Miyamoto confessed the difficulty of repeatedly attempting to describe and justify the long-promised potential of the mysterious peripheral to a curious public. He said that it "would have been easier to understand if the DD was already included when the N64 first came out. It's getting harder to explain after the fact. (laughs)" To illustrate the fundamental significance of the 64DD to all game development at Nintendo, Itoi said, "I came up with a lot of ideas because of the 64DD. All things start with the 64DD. There are so many ideas I wouldn't have been allowed to come up with if we didn't have the 64DD." Miyamoto concluded, "Almost every new project for the N64 is based on the 64DD. ... we'll make the game on a cartridge first, then add the technology we've cultivated to finish it up as a full-out 64DD game." By 1998, IGN optimistically expected all major Nintendo 64 cartridge games to have software support for an impending expansion disk. Known third-party 64DD developers included Konami, Culture Brain, Seta, Japan System Supply, Titus, Infogrames, Rare, Paradigm Entertainment, Ocean, and Factor 5.

More delays were subsequently announced. The American launch was delayed to late 1998. The Japanese launch was delayed to June 1998, later adjusted by the apologetic announcement on April 3, 1998, that it would launch "within the year". The 64DD was conspicuously absent from E3 1998, having been briefly described the prior day as "definitely not" launching in 1998 and "questionable" in 1999, which Next Generation magazine interpreted as being "as close to 'dead' as we can imagine". IGN pessimistically explained that the peripheral's launch delays were so significant, and Nintendo's software library was so dependent upon the 64DD, that this lack of launchable software also caused Nintendo to entirely cancel Space World for 1998.

On April 8, 1999, IGN announced Nintendo's latest delayed launch date of 64DD and the nearly complete Mario Artist, as June 1999. Demonstrated at the May 1999 E3 as what IGN called an "almost forgotten visitor", there was no longer a plan for release outside Japan, and its launch in Japan was still withheld by the lack of completed launch games. In June 1999, IGN reported that month's completion of Randnet and the modem, as having "breathed new life into what many have called the most elusive piece of vaporware to date". IGN said Nintendo "is surprisingly confident about the 64DD and is predicting to sell the full initial shipment of 500,000 before year's end".

As of Space World 1999 in August, Nintendo had set Randnet's launch date at December 1, 1999, but reportedly had not yet set a launch date for the 64DD. The 64DD pre-order program had been recently announced for mid-September, and was now delayed to November or December. Earthbound 64, which IGN cynically called "in development for nearly 1,000 years", had been heavily anticipated inside the company and globally as a crucial 64DD launch game, but the sudden announcement of its release being retargeted from disk to  cartridge plus expansion disk was interpreted by IGN as unsurprising and as a sign of possible further delay or cancellation of the 64DD. Nintendo's 64DD booth demonstrated eight launch games, including DT Bloodmasters with a data transfer (DT) cable from Game Boy Color to 64DD. Nintendo listed many more 64DD games in development. Randnet had recently been announced and was being tested in Japan.

Launch 
The 64DD was launched on December 13, 1999, exclusively in Japan, as a package called the Randnet Starter Kit including six games bimonthly through the mail, and one year of Internet service. Core Magazine and IGN reported Nintendo's stated initial retail shipment of 500,000 units.

Anticipating that its long-planned peripheral would become a commercial failure, Nintendo initially sold the Randnet Starter Kit via mail order. Later, very limited quantities of the individual 64DD and games were released to stores.

Discontinuation 
On August 25, 2000, Space World was signified by the launches of the GameCube and Game Boy Advance, and by what IGN considered to be the unofficial discontinuation of the 64DD, jokingly calling it "DeaDD". According to IGN, "Nintendo did not speak about 64DD during its opening speech, nor did the hardware itself have any booth presence. In fact, the unofficial 'No 64DD!' policy seemed to be enforced by Nintendo so brutally that had we even muttered the name of the hardware, we would have probably been tossed out of the show."

In October 2000, Nintendo announced the impending discontinuation of the 64DD and Randnet, with 15,000 active subscribers. They were discontinued in February 2001. Only ten 64DD disks were ever released, including three third-party games and one Internet application suite. Most planned 64DD games were either released on increasingly larger Nintendo 64 Game Pak, ported to other consoles like the PlayStation or GameCube, or canceled entirely.

Hardware 

Nintendo designed the 64DD as an enabling technology for the development of new genres of games, which was principally accomplished by its three main design features: its dual storage strategy of cartridges and disks; its new real-time clock (RTC); and its Internet connectivity. The dual storage strategy of the Nintendo 64 plus the 64DD combines the traditional high speed cartridges, which are low-capacity, non-writable, and expensive but very fast along with the introduction of proprietary mass storage disks, which are large-capacity, rewritable, and cheap but only moderately fast.

Though incompatible in every way with any other consumer electronics product, the 64DD's magnetic storage format is a proprietary floppy disk, resembling the large and sturdy shell of the proprietary Zip disk for personal computers. Though various prominent sources have mistakenly referred to the medium as being magneto-optical technology, Nintendo's own developer documentation refers to it in detail as being magnetic. Complementing its proprietary and copy-protected cartridge strategy, the proprietary 64MB disk format was Nintendo's faster, more flexible, and copy-protected answer to the commodity Compact Disc format, which is cheaper to produce but is much slower, read-only, and easier to copy on personal computers. The most advanced CD technology delivered by the contemporaneous Sega Saturn and Sony PlayStation game consoles can hold at least 650 megabytes (MB) of information with a peak 300kB/s throughput and more than 200 ms seek speed. This compares to the Nintendo 64's cartridge's 4 to 64MB size and 5 to 50MB/s of low latency and instantaneous load times, and the 64DD's 64MB disk size and 1MB/s peak throughput with 75 ms average seek latency. The high seek latency and low maximum throughput of a 2x CD-ROM drive contribute to stuttering and to very long loading times throughout a gameplay session in many games, in addition to a much higher production cost, testing cycle, and potential development time for all the potential extra content.

As an example of variable storage strategies, Nintendo determined that the development of The Legend of Zelda: Ocarina of Time would be retargeted from 64DD disk format alone, to the much faster cartridge format plus expansions on the cheaper floppy disk, to optimize performance and cost.

Similar in proportion of the historical comparison of Famicom Disk System floppy disks to early Famicom cartridges, this disk format's initial design specifications had been set during a time frame when the initial Nintendo 64 cartridge size was 4MB as with Super Mario 64, and a 32MB size eventually became popular over the years.  Nonetheless, the 64DD disk format would serve as significant storage size expansion upon its 1999 launch when 32MB cartridges were the norm and on into future years when only three 64MB cartridges would ever be released for Nintendo 64.  The writability of up to 38MB per disk, would yield enduring benefits to emerging game genres and social gaming like that of the Famicom Disk System.

Many Game Paks retain vestigial detection of 64DD and optional expansion disk, most of which were never released, and proceed as a standalone game. Expansions can provide sequels, extra levels, minigames, or store user-generated content. Other storage options include a few kilobytes on the Controller Pak or on a battery-backed Game Pak, for storing basic game status.

In addition to writable storage, the 64DD's real-time clock (RTC) enables persistent worlds according to a battery-backed clock and calendar. Shigeru Miyamoto, said this of the canceled four-year development of the pet breeding game Cabbage: "We're doing it on the 64DD because I wanted to make a clock function, such that even if the power is cut, can still raise the creature."

The system includes a modem cartridge for Randnet, which connected to the Internet and to members-only portal sites.

The 64DD has an enhanced font and audio library, potentially saving space of cartridges and disks. A 32-bit coprocessor operates disks and transfers data to the console, where the RCP and CPU process data. Like nearly all disc-based consoles, the 64DD has a boot menu to operate without a cartridge. The 64DD is packaged with the 4MB RAM Expansion Pak, totaling 8MB. The 64DD software development kit works with the Nintendo 64 development kit.

Accessories 

The 64DD Randnet bundle includes a modem for connecting to the Randnet network and the 4MB RAM Expansion Pak. Other accessories include a keyboard, a mouse, and an audio-video capture port (female RCA jack, and line in) called the Capture Cassette (or cartridge).

The CPU-powered  software modem cartridge was developed in partnership between Nexus Telocation Systems, Ltd. and Surf Communications. It is housed on a special cartridge with a port for the included modular cable, which then connects to the network. It is the Nintendo 64's only officially licensed Internet connectivity product, and the early discussions between Surf and Nintendo to have built a modem directly into the console did not materialize.

Coincidentally, an unlicensed third party alternative was produced for America by InterAct in the form of the SharkWire Online system.

Randnet 

In April 1999, Nintendo ended the partnership with St.GIGA which had created the Super Famicom's proprietary Satellaview online service in Japan, broadcasting from April 23, 1995, to June 30, 2000. The company then partnered with Japanese media company Recruit to develop the 64DD's completely new proprietary online service called Randnet (a portmanteau of "Recruit and Nintendo network"). The resulting equity-owned joint Japanese corporation was announced on June 30, 1999, as RandnetDD Co., Ltd. Operating only in Japan, from December 13, 1999 to February 28, 2001, the Randnet service allowed gamers to surf the Internet including a members-only portal, and to share user-generated data including artwork. The subscription fee included the dialup Internet account, 64DD system hardware, and a delivery schedule of game disks by mail. Reportedly, Nintendo and several third party game developers had originally planned multiplayer online gaming as being more important than even a web browser.

The Randnet Starter Kit comes packaged with the 64DD peripheral and everything needed to have accessed the service.
64DD: The writable 64MB disk drive system.
Nintendo 64 Modem
Expansion Pak: This 4MB RAM expansion upgrades the Nintendo 64's system RAM to a total of 8MB.
Randnet Browser Disk: This let users of the former online service access the "members only" information exchange page as well as the Internet. Once logged on to the service, players could choose from the following options:
Editing Tool: Create custom avatars to interact with other users.
Information Exchange: Use online message boards and share email with other users.
Community: Swap messages with the game programmers and producers.
Internet Surfing: Surf the Internet with the custom web browser, formatted for viewing on a television set.
Postcards: Mario Artist was intended to allow the design and printing of postcards to be sent via postal mail.
E-commerce: The GET Mall service sold CDs, books, 64DD games, and peripherals.
Digital Magazine: The ability to check online sports scores, weather, and news was planned, but only features related to horse racing were released.

Nintendo had originally promised these canceled features:
NES games: The emulator was completed for downloadable NES games.
Battle Mode: Play against other gamers and swap scores. Mah-jongg was announced with online multiplayer mode DT Bloodmasters with online card trading, Ultimate War with online multiplayer mode, and Wall Street with daily online stock price updates.
Observation Mode: Watch other players' game sessions like ghost data.
Beta Test: Download sample levels from upcoming games.
Music Distribution: Listen to music, some of which was yet to be released in stores.

From November 11, 1999 to January 11, 2000, the first round of membership registration for Randnet's Internet service opened to a maximum of 100,000 subscribers on a "first come, first served" basis. The Randnet service was accessible only via a Nintendo 64 and 64DD setup, and the 64DD hardware and games were only purchasable by mail order along with a Randnet subscription; the peripheral was not stocked in any retail stores. It was all purchased at one time by filling out a mail order request form at select retail stores throughout Japan: convenience stores, toy stores, and video game retailers. The hardware was delivered soon and the games delivered as monthly nationwide releases across the following year.

The plan was available in two tiers: a purchase plan for users who want to buy only the 64DD to add to their existing Nintendo 64 system, or a lease-to-own plan for those who want both the 64DD and a special edition translucent black Nintendo 64 console. The 64DD and some later games eventually became available for purchase directly at retail.

As part of the subscription, the game disks were delivered not in the initial package but by mail on a schedule: December 1999 had Doshin the Giant and Mario Artist: Paint Studio; February 2000 had Randnet Disk, SimCity 64, and Mario Artist: Talent Studio; and April 2000 had F-Zero X Expansion Kit and Mario Artist: Polygon Studio.  The final Starter Kit subscription title Polygon Studio was suddenly delayed and then released on August 29, 2000.

One of the most substantial series of games to include Randnet support is the Mario Artist series, which allowed online users to swap their artwork creations with others. Contests and other special events occurred periodically. Papercraft was implemented by way of modelling the characters in Mario Artist: Polygon Studio and utilizing Mario Artist: Communication Kit to upload the model data to Randnet's online printing service. The user can then cut, fold, and adhere the resulting colored paper into a full-bodied 3D papercraft figure.

Because the 64DD hardware package was primarily sold with a mandatory subscription to Randnet, the service was fairly popular among the limited 64DD user base. Overall, the service didn't garner enough subscribers to justify its continued existence, and in October 2000, the service's impending closure was announced.  The 64 Dream magazine relayed a Nintendo public relations statement that there had been approximately 15,000 Randnet subscribers at the time of this announcement, indicating that there had been at least that many hardware units sold to customers. Nintendo offered to buy back all the Randnet-purchased consumer hardware and to give free service to all users from the announcement of closure, until the day it actually went offline. The Randnet service closed on February 28, 2001 and Nintendo's equity partnership with RandnetDD Co., Ltd. was liquidated from June 30, 2001 to  January 31, 2002.

Games

Released 

A total of ten disks were released for 64DD, which comprise nine games and one dialup utility disk.

Proposed 
More than 60 games were announced for the 64DD that ended up being released on Nintendo 64 cartridge format only, being totally canceled due to the system's delays or commercial failure, or being ported to another console such as Nintendo GameCube, Sony PlayStation, Sega Dreamcast, Sony PlayStation 2, or Microsoft Xbox.

7th Legion
Automobili Lamborghini Add-On
Cabbage (unreleased, influencing Nintendogs and others)
Communication Game (online game by the development team of PostPet, a famous Japanese email application)
Creator (later integrated into the Mario Artist series)
DD Sequencer
Derby Stallion 64 (released on cartridge)
Desert Island: No Man's Island
Dezaemon 3D Expansion Kit
Diablo
Digital Horse Racing Newspaper
Digital Sports Newspaper (canceled)
Doubutsu Banchou (Animal Leader, previewed on Game Pak and released on GameCube as Cubivore: Survival of the Fittest)
Dōbutsu no Mori (Animal Forest, released as a cartridge with an embedded RTC in Japan, and later as Animal Crossing on GameCube)
Dragon Warrior VII (ported and released on the Sony PlayStation instead)
DT Bloodmasters
Emperor of the Jungle (canceled)
Far East of Eden: Oriental Blue (canceled, becoming a GBA game of the same name)
Fire Emblem 64 (canceled, with plot elements later used on Fire Emblem: Fūin no Tsurugi for GBA)
Gendai Dai-Senryaku: Ultimate War (converted to cartridge in 2000 and canceled)
Hybrid Heaven (released on cartridge)
Kirby 64: The Crystal Shards (released on cartridge)
Mario Artist: Game Maker (canceled)
Mario Artist: Graphical Message Maker (canceled)
Mario Artist: Sound Maker (split out from Paint Studio and then canceled)
Mario Artist: Video Jockey Maker (canceled)
Mario Party 2 (released on cartridge)
Mario no Photopi (cartridge released without 64DD storage option)
Mission: Impossible (released on cartridge)
Morita Shogi 64 (released on cartridge)
Mother 3 (EarthBound 64) (converted to cartridge with expansion disk in 1999, canceled in 2000, then redeveloped and released as Mother 3 for GBA in Japan)
Mother 3.5 (Mother 3 expansion)
Mysterious Dungeon: Shiren the Wanderer 2 (released on cartridge)
Namco RPG
Ogre Battle Saga (released on cartridge)
 (redeveloped and released for GBA)
Pokémon Snap (released on cartridge)
Pokémon 64/Pokémon RPG
Pokémon Stadium (released on cartridge)
Pokémon Stadium Expansion Disk
Pokémon Stadium 2 (released on cartridge)
Project Cairo
Resident Evil Zero (released on GameCube)
Rev Limit (canceled)
Seaman (released on Dreamcast)
SimCopter 64 (canceled)
Snatcher
SnowSpeeder (released on cartridge)
Street Fighter III
Super Mario 64 2
Super Mario RPG 2 or Super Mario Adventure (released on cartridge as Mario Story in Japan and Paper Mario in the rest of the world)
Suul
Teo
Toukon Road: Brave Spirits Add-On
Unreal (canceled)
Wall Street
Ultra Donkey Kong (released on cartridge as Donkey Kong 64)
Ura Zelda (canceled but then released for GameCube as Master Quest)
Yoshi's Island 64 (released on cartridge as Yoshi's Story)
Yousuke Ide's Mah-jongg School (converted to dual disk/cartridge, then canceled)
Zelda 64 (released on cartridge as The Legend of Zelda: Ocarina of Time)
Zelda Gaiden (released on cartridge as The Legend of Zelda: Majora's Mask)

Reception 
Rating the overall system at 6.0 out of 10.0, IGN's Peer Schneider finds the industrial design language of the 64DD and its accessories to perfectly match and integrate with that of the Nintendo 64, with no user-accessible moving parts, a single mechanical eject button, sharing the N64's power button, and child-friendly usability.  Installation is said to be "quick and painless", operation is "even simpler", and the whole system "couldn't be easier to use".  Software load times are described as "minimal", where the most complex possible point of the system's library reaches about five seconds.  The site says that the 64DD popularity was inherently limited, due in part to its limited release in Japan, a country which had a limited adoption of the Nintendo 64 and of dialup Internet connectivity.

Schneider found the combination of the Randnet's web browser and the mouse to provide a "passable surfing experience".  He described the portal's private content as "much too limited", where "[a]nyone who has used the Internet would snicker at the lack of up-to-date contents or tools offered on Randnet". He was disappointed in the companies' failure to have ever delivered certain promised online features, such as game beta testing and music distribution. But it provides new users with a "simple network [which] functions as first baby steps into the vast world of the Internet".

Schneider liked the overall product value provided by the Randnet Starter Kit, including hardware, games, accessories, and Internet subscription. However, the platform's abrupt discontinuation proved to limit the appeal to a per item basis rather than as a whole.  Because these items were sold only as a soon-discontinued bundle, all with such ultimately limited application, he found the disks' cheaper prices to be aggregated back up to the level of cartridges.

He found the Mario Artist series (especially the 64DD's "killer app", Talent Studio) to be uniquely compelling in creative ways that "couldn't be done on any other gaming console on the market", utilizing the disks' writability and "[leaving] CD systems behind". As a flagship 64DD game, IGN found Paint Studios well-made art creation functionality to be both a low-cost paint program, and edutainment akin to an Adobe Photoshop for kids. Knowing Nintendo's stated plans, he supposed that if the platform hadn't been abruptly canceled, Nintendo would have utilized Paint Studio as a source of user-generated art content for a substantial library of customizable games. IGN also called Wall Street a 64DD killer app, though canceled.

Schneider acknowledges Nintendo's vision, attributing the system's downfall generally upon the drastically changing marketplace during the several years of delays. He summarized the 64DD as "an appealing creativity package" "targeted at a certain type of user" "that delivered a well-designed user-driven experience"—and a "limited online experiment at the same time", which partially fulfilled Nintendo president Hiroshi Yamauchi's "longtime dream of a network that connects Nintendo consoles all across the nation".

Core Magazine honored the 64DD: "In Japanese culture, there is a concept known as mono no aware. While this term completely defies English translation, one of its connotations is that there is nobility in things that soon perish."

Nintendo reported 15,000 active Randnet subscribers as of the October 2000 announcement of the service's impending closure, implying the sale of at least as many requisite 64DD units.

Legacy 

New genres of games were developed due to the advent of 64DD's rewritable mass storage, real-time clock (RTC), and Internet appliance functionality. However, the system's commercial failure required many 64DD games to be released on traditional Nintendo 64 cartridges alone, ported to other consoles, or canceled.

Some of these standalone Nintendo 64 cartridge releases include the equivalent of the 64DD's RTC chip directly on board the cartridge, as with Japan's Animal Forest.   The  RAM Expansion Pak became a sometimes mandatory staple of Nintendo 64 game development, being packaged along with a few cartridge games.  All subsequent Nintendo consoles would directly include RTC functionality.

The concept of the popular multiplatform Animal Crossing series originated with the 64DD's rewritable storage and RTC. The eventual initial release of the series was adapted to utilize only the Nintendo 64 cartridge format with an embedded RTC, in the form of Japan's Animal Forest. That game was cosmetically adapted for GameCube (with the console's built-in RTC and its removable and rewritable memory cards) with the new name of Animal Crossing.  All games in the series are played in real time persistent game world, with the passage of time being recorded on writable media.  The realtime effect reflects real seasons, real holidays, virtual plant growth, development of virtual relationships, and other events.  Interactivity between real human players on different subsequent console generations has been enabled through the swapping of various Nintendo consoles' writable mass storage cards or through online communications.

The legacy of what is now the Nintendogs series originated because of 64DD, in the form of a pet creature breeding prototype called Cabbage. Never released, it had been codeveloped by Shigesato Itoi (designer of EarthBound), Tsunekazu Ishihara (designer of Pokémon), and Shigeru Miyamoto. Its publicized four-year development was fundamentally enabled by the real-time clock and mass writability, where Miyamoto explained, "We're doing it on the 64DD because I wanted to make a clock function, such that even if the power is cut, [the game] can still raise the creature" and with optionally purchasable enhancement data. A subset of creature maintenance functionality is made portable on the Game Boy via the Transfer Pak, to be synchronized back to the 64DD disk. In 2006, Miyamoto concluded that "the conversations and design techniques that popped up when we were making Cabbage are, of course, connected to Nintendogs and other things that we're doing now."

The concept of a personal avatar creator app which had begun with prototypes for the Famicom was solidified in Mario Artist: Talent Studio and then has been seen on all subsequent Nintendo consoles. Those Talent Studio avatars can be imported into select 64DD games including the SimCity 64 game. Nintendo designer Yamashita Takayuki credits his work on Talent Studio as having been foundational to his conception and development of the entire Mii component of the Wii platform a decade later. The game's concepts were reportedly specifically foundational to the characters in Wii Tennis.

The concept of graphical stamps that are seen in various Miiverse-supported games is found in Mario Artist: Paint Studio and Mario Paint.

The user-creation of graphics, animations, levels, and minigames which are in the Mario Artist series and F-Zero X Expansion Kit are revisited in later console generations. The idea of minigames was popularized generally during the Nintendo 64's fifth generation of video game consoles. Some early minigames can actually be created in Mario Artist: Polygon Studio in the style that would later be used in the WarioWare series of games.  Certain minigames directly originated there, as explained by Goro Abe of Nintendo R&D1's so-called Wario Ware All-Star Team: "In Polygon Studio you could create 3D models and animate them in the game, but there was also a side game included inside. In this game, you would have to play short games that came one after another. This is where the idea for Wario Ware came from."

In 2018, historian Chris Kohler said that as one of Nintendo's "oddest" products, the 64DD is "now a sought-after collectible and a unique piece of the company's long, long history of bold experimentation".

See also 

Famicom Modem
Famicom Disk System
Sega CD - A similar peripheral for the Sega Genesis.
Satellaview

Notes

References 

1990s toys
2000s toys
Fifth-generation video game consoles
Japan-only video game hardware
Joint ventures
64
Products introduced in 1999
Products and services discontinued in 2001
Video game console add-ons
Video game storage media
Discontinued video game consoles